Sumsk is an air base in Leningrad Oblast, Russia located 28 km southwest of Volosovo. It is an abandoned 1960s-era airfield, listed as a major aerodrome on a 1974 Department of Defense Global Navigation Chart No. 3 as having jet facilities.  The geometrics now barely visible on Google Earth.

References
RussianAirFields.com

Soviet Air Force bases